In mythology and the study of folklore and religion, a trickster is a character in a story (god, goddess, spirit, human or anthropomorphisation) who exhibits a great degree of intellect or secret knowledge and uses it to play tricks or otherwise disobey normal rules and defy conventional behavior.

Mythology
Tricksters, as archetypal characters, appear in the myths of many different cultures. Lewis Hyde describes the trickster as a "boundary-crosser". The trickster crosses and often breaks both physical and societal rules: Tricksters "violate principles of social and natural order, playfully disrupting normal life and then re-establishing it on a new basis."

Often, this bending or breaking of rules takes the form of tricks or thievery. Tricksters can be cunning or foolish or both. The trickster openly questions, disrupts or mocks authority. 

Many cultures have tales of the trickster, a crafty being who uses tricks to get food, steal precious possessions, or simply cause mischief. In some Greek myths Hermes plays the trickster. He is the patron of thieves and the inventor of lying, a gift he passed on to Autolycus, who in turn passed it on to Odysseus.  In Slavic folktales, the trickster and the culture hero are often combined. 

Frequently the trickster figure exhibits gender and form variability. In Norse mythology the mischief-maker is Loki, who is also a shapeshifter. Loki also exhibits sex variability, in one case even becoming pregnant. He becomes a mare who later gives birth to Odin's eight-legged horse Sleipnir. 

In a wide variety of African-language communities, the rabbit, or hare, is the trickster (see Brer Rabbit). In West Africa (and thence into the Caribbean via the slave trade), the spider (see Anansi) is often the trickster.

Trickster or clown
The trickster is a term used for a non performing "trick maker"; they may have many motives behind their intention but those motives are not largely in public view. They are internal to the character or person.

The clown on the other hand is a persona of a performer who intentionally displays their actions in public for an audience.

In Native American tradition
While the trickster crosses various cultural traditions, there are significant differences between tricksters in the traditions of different parts of the world:

Many native traditions held clowns and tricksters as essential to any contact with the sacred. People could not pray until they had laughed, because laughter opens and frees from rigid preconception. Humans had to have tricksters within the most sacred ceremonies for fear that they forget the sacred comes through upset, reversal, surprise. The trickster in most native traditions is essential to creation, to birth.

Native American tricksters should not be confused with the European fictional picaro.  One of the most important distinctions is that "we can see in the Native American trickster an openness to life's multiplicity and paradoxes largely missing in the modern Euro-American moral tradition". In some stories the Native American trickster is foolish and other times wise. He can be a hero in one tale and a villain in the next.

In many Native American and First Nations mythologies, the Coyote spirit (Southwestern United States) or Raven spirit (Pacific Northwest) stole fire from the gods (stars, moon, and/or sun). Both are usually seen as jokesters and pranksters. In Native American creation stories, when Coyote teaches humans how to catch salmon, he makes the first fish weir out of logs and branches.

Wakdjunga in Winnebago mythology is an example of the trickster archetype.

Wisakedjak (Wìsakedjàk in Algonquin, Wīsahkēcāhk(w) in Cree and Wiisagejaak in Oji-Cree) is a trickster figure in Algonquin and Chipewyan Storytelling.

Coyote

The Coyote mythos is one of the most popular among western Native American cultures, especially among indigenous peoples of California and the Great Basin.

According to Crow (and other Plains) tradition, Old Man Coyote impersonates the Creator: "Old Man Coyote took up a handful of mud and out of it made people". He also bestowed names on buffalo, deer, elk, antelopes, and bear. According to A. Hultkranz, the impersonation of Coyote as Creator is a result of a taboo, a mythic substitute to the religious notion of the Great Spirit whose name was too dangerous and/or sacred to use apart from at special ceremonies.

In Chelan myths, Coyote belongs to the animal people but he is at the same time "a power just like the Creator, the head of all the creatures." while still being a subject of the Creator who can punish him or remove his powers. In the Pacific Northwest tradition, Coyote is mostly mentioned as a messenger, or minor power.

As the culture hero, Coyote appears in various mythic traditions, but generally with the same magical powers of transformation, resurrection, and "medicine". He is engaged in changing the ways of rivers, creating new landscapes and getting sacred things for people. Of mention is the tradition of Coyote fighting against monsters. According to Wasco tradition, Coyote was the hero to fight and kill Thunderbird, the killer of people, but he could do that not because of his personal power, but due to the help of the Spirit Chief. In some stories, Multnomah Falls came to be by Coyote's efforts; in others, it is done by Raven.

More often than not Coyote is a trickster, but always different. In some stories, he is a noble trickster: "Coyote takes water from the Frog people... because it is not right that one people have all the water." In others, he is malicious: "Coyote determined to bring harm to Duck. He took Duck's wife and children, whom he treated badly."

In oral stories

 Abenaki mythology: Azeban
 African mythology: Ekwensu
 Afro-Cuban mythology: Eleggua, Eshu
 Akan mythology: Kwaku Ananse
 American folklore of African origin: Brer Rabbit (compare Compère Lapin in the French-speaking Caribbean)
 *  from a separate African origin Aunt Nancy, a corruption of Anansi, also spelt 'Anansee', among other spellings
 Arabian mythology: Juha, Sinbad
 Ashanti folklore: Anansi
 Australian Aboriginal mythology: Bamapana, Crow
 Aztec mythology: Huehuecoyotl
 Babylonian mythology: Lilith
 Bantu mythology: Hare (Tsuro or Kalulu)
 Basque mythology: San Martin Txiki
 Belgian mythology: Lange Wapper 
 Brazilian folklore: Saci, Curupira
 Bulgarian/Macedonian folklore: Hitar Petar (Itar Pejo)
 Caribbean folklore: Anansi
 Celtic mythology: Fairy, Puck, puca
 Chinese mythology: Huli jing (Fox spirit), Nezha, Red Boy, Sun Wukong (Monkey King)
 Cree mythology: Wisakedjak
 Crow mythology: Awakkule, Mannegishi
 Dutch folklore: Reynaert de Vos, Tijl Uilenspiegel
 Egyptian mythology: Set, Isis
 English folklore: Robin Hood, Puck, Brownies
 Fijian mythology: Daucina
 French folklore: Renart the Fox
 German folklore: Reineke Fuchs, the Pied Piper, Till Eulenspiegel
 Greek mythology: Eris, Prometheus, Hermes, Odysseus, Sisyphus, Dolos
 Haitian folklore: Anansi, Ti Malice
 Hawaiian mythology: Kaulu, Kupua
 Hindu mythology: Baby Krishna (stealing butter), Narada, Mohini, Hanuman (shapeshifting and teasing sages).
 Hopi and Zuni mythology: Kokopelli
 Igbo mythology: Mbeku
 Indonesian folklore: Kantjil, or kancil in modern orthography
 Inuit mythology: Amaguq
 Irish folklore: Leprechauns, Briccriu
 Islamic mythology: Iblis, Khidr, Nasreddin
 Italian folklore: Giufà (Sicily), Pulcinella (Naples)
 Japanese mythology: Kitsune, Susanoo, Kappa, Bake-danuki, Hare of Inaba
 Jewish folklore: Hershele Ostropoler (Ashkenazi), Joha (Sephardic)
 Kazakh folklore: Aldar kose
 Kiowa folklore: Saynday
 Korean folklore: Kumiho, Dokkaebi
 Lakota mythology: Iktomi, Heyoka
 Latin American and Spanish folklore: Pedro Urdemales (Pedro Malasartes in Portuguese)
 Levantine mythology: Yaw
 Māori mythology: Māui
 Mayan mythology: Maya Hero Twins, Kisin
 Micronesian mythology: Olifat
 Miwok mythology: Coyote
 Nigerian mythology: Agadzagadza
 Norse mythology: Loki
 Norwegian mythology: Espen Askeladd
 Northwest Caucasian mythology: Sosruko
 Ohlone mythology: Coyote
 Ojibwe mythology: Nanabozho
 Philippine mythology: Nuno sa Punso, Tikbalang, Pilandok
 Polynesian mythology: Maui
 Pomo mythology: Coyote
 Pueblos dancing: Koshares
 Romanian mythology: Păcală
 Russian folklore: Ivan the Fool
 San Folklore: ǀKaggen
 Slavic mythology: Veles
 Spanish mythology: Don Juan, The Trickster of Seville
 Sumerian religion: Enki
 Tibetan folklore: Akhu Tönpa,
 Thai folklore: Sri Thanonchai
 Tumbuka mythology: Kalulu
 Ute mythology: Cin-an-ev
 Vietnamese folklore: Bang Bạnh - Xã Xệ - Lý Toét, Bờm, Cuội, Bác Ba Phi, Lật Đời, Trạng Quỳnh
 Vodou: Papa Legba, Ti Malice, Baron Samedi
 Welsh mythology: Gwydion, Taliesin, Morgan Le Fay, Twm Siôn Cati
 West African mythology: Anansi

In literature and popular culture
In modern literature, the trickster survives as a character archetype, not necessarily supernatural or divine, sometimes no more than a stock character.

Often, the trickster is distinct in a story by their acting as a sort of catalyst; their antics are the cause of other characters' discomfiture, but they are left untouched. Shakespeare's Puck is an example of this.
Another once-famous example was the character Froggy the Gremlin on the early USA children's television show "Andy's Gang".  A cigar-puffing puppet, Froggy induced the adult humans around him to engage in ridiculous and self-destructive hi-jinks.

For example, many European fairy tales have a king who wants to find the best groom for his daughter by ordering several trials. No brave and valiant prince or knight manages to win them, until a poor and simple peasant comes. With the help of his wits and cleverness, instead of fighting, they evade or fool monsters, villains and dangers in unorthodox ways. Against expectations, the most unlikely candidate passes the trials and receives the reward.

More modern and obvious examples of the same type include Bugs Bunny in the USA and from Sweden the female hero in the Pippi Longstocking stories.

In Internet and multimedia studies
In online environments, there has been a link between the trickster and Internet trolling. Some have said that a trickster is a type of online community character.

Anthropologist James Cuffe has called the Chinese internet character Grass Mud Horse (草泥马) a trickster candidate because of its duplicity in meaning. Cuffe argues the Grass Mud Horse serves to highlight the creative potential of the trickster archetype in communicating experiential understanding through symbolic narrative. The Grass Mud Horse relies on the interpretative capacity of storytelling in order to skirt internet censorship while simultaneously commenting on the experience of censorship in China. In this sense Cuffe proposes the Grass Mud Horse trickster as 'a heuristic cultural function to aid the perceiver to re-evaluate their own experiential understanding against that of their communities. By framing itself against and in spite of limits the trickster offers new coordinates by which one can reassess and judges one's own experiences.'

See also

 Grotesque body
 Structuralist approach to myth
 Malandro
 Miwok Coyote and Silver Fox
 Native Americans in the United States

References

Sources

 Datlow, Ellen and Terri Windling. 2009. The Coyote Road: Trickster Tales. Firebird.
 California on the Eve - California Indians Miwok creation story
 Joseph Durwin Coulrophobia & The Trickster

Lori Landay Madcaps, Screwballs, and Con Women: The Female Trickster in American Culture 1998 University of Pennsylvania Press
 Paul Radin The trickster: a study in American Indian mythology (1956)
Allan J. Ryan The Trickster Shift: Humour and irony in contemporary native art 1999 Univ of Washington 
 Trickster's Way Volume 3, Issue 1 2004 Article 3 "Trickster and the Treks of History".
Tannen, R. S., The Female Trickster: PostModern and Post-Jungian Perspectives on Women in Contemporary Culture, Routledge, 2007

External links

Joel Chandler Harris and the Uncle Remus Collection

 
Mythological archetypes
Antagonists by role
Jungian archetypes
Literary archetypes